The Ink Spots were an American pop vocal group who gained international fame in the 1930s and 1940s. Their unique musical style presaged the rhythm and blues and rock and roll musical genres, and the subgenre doo-wop. The Ink Spots were widely accepted in both the white and black communities, largely due to the ballad style introduced to the group by lead singer Bill Kenny.

In 1989, the Ink Spots (Bill Kenny, Charlie Fuqua, Deek Watson, Jerry Daniels and Orville Jones) were inducted into the Rock and Roll Hall of Fame, and in 1999 they were inducted into the Vocal Group Hall of Fame. Since the Ink Spots disbanded in 1954, there have been well over a hundred vocal groups calling themselves "The Ink Spots", with and without any original members of the group. It has often been the case that these groups claimed to be "second generation" or "third generation" Ink Spots.

1930s

Early background of founding members
As "Jerry and Charlie", Daniels and Fuqua had formed a vocal duo performing in the Indianapolis area around 1931. About the same time, Jones and Watson were part of a quartet, "The Four Riff Brothers", who appeared regularly on radio station WLW in Cincinnati, Ohio. In 1933, that group disbanded, and Watson, Daniels and Fuqua got together to form a new vocal, instrumental and comedy group, which was initially called "King, Jack, and Jester". They continued to appear regularly on radio in Ohio, and became a foursome when Jones was added to the group the following year.

In July 1934, they accepted a booking at the Apollo Theater, New York, supporting Tiny Bradshaw. At this point they had changed their name to "The 4 Ink Spots". The Ink Spots formed in 1934 in Indianapolis. Later in 1934, the Ink Spots achieved international success touring the UK with Jack Hylton's Orchestra, one review in the Melody Maker stating

They first recorded for Victor Records in 1935, but although the group was growing rapidly in popularity, their early record releases were not commercially successful. Their first recordings included songs such as "Swingin' On The Strings", "Your Feet's Too Big", "Don't 'Low No Swingin' In Here" and "Swing, Gate, Swing".

Bill Kenny joins 
In 1936, Daniels was replaced by a 21-year-old singer from Baltimore, Bill Kenny, who signed on with the Ink Spots after winning first place in an amateur contest at Harlem's Savoy Ballroom. Three years later, Kenny was credited for bringing the group to global success with his unusual high tenor ballad singing.

In 1938, after being in the group for two years, Kenny started to introduce the group to a new format that he called "Top & Bottom". This format was used primarily for ballads rather than the uptempo "jive" songs the group was used to performing. This format called for the tenor (Kenny or Watson) to sing the lead for one chorus followed by a chorus performed by bass singer Jones reciting the lyrics rather than singing them. After a chorus of the "talking bass" the lead tenor sang the rest of the song until the end. The earliest example of their "Top & Bottom" format is from a radio broadcast from 1938. The song, titled "Tune In on My Heart", features Kenny taking the lead and Jones performing the talking bass.

Also in 1938, Kenny took his first feature solo in Decca studios. His feature was on a song titled "I Wish You the Best of Everything".  Although it was not in the "Top & Bottom" format it was a ballad and used the signature Ink Spots guitar intro. Even though it got a good response, it was not very successful in terms of record sales and did not reach the pop chart.

"If I Didn't Care" and the late 1930s

On January 12, 1939, the Ink Spots entered Decca studios to record a ballad written by a young songwriter named Jack Lawrence. This ballad, "If I Didn't Care", was to be one of their biggest hits, selling over 19 million copies and becoming the 8th-best-selling single of all time. It was also the first recording by the group to reach the US Pop Charts. Despite its popularity, "If I Didn't Care" never reached #1 on the US Pop Charts, staying at #2 for several weeks. This is the first studio recorded example of the Ink Spots "Top & Bottom" format with Kenny singing lead and Jones performing the "talking bass". For this recording, each member was paid $37.50; however, after the record sold 200,000 Decca destroyed the original contract and the group was paid an additional $3,750. This was the recording that brought the group to global fame and established the "Top & Bottom" format as the Ink Spots "trademark". From 1939 until the group's disbanding in 1954, many of their songs employed this format.
The year 1939 also saw the Ink Spots at the top of the US Pop Charts with five other recordings that featured Kenny in the "Top & Bottom" format. Their biggest hit of 1939 was the Lombardo, Marks & Hill ballad "Address Unknown". This was their first #1 hit on the US Pop Charts. Other chart toppers from 1939 included "My Prayer", "Bless You", "Memories of You", and "I'm Gettin' Sentimental Over You".

1940s

Recordings
Between the years 1940 and 1949 the Ink Spots landed well over 30 hits on the US Pop Charts with 18 of them on the top 10. The group’s first #1 hit of the 1940s was "We Three (My Echo, My Shadow and Me)" which they recorded in 1940. In 1944 the Ink Spots teamed up with Ella Fitzgerald to record "I'm Making Believe", and "Into Each Life Some Rain Must Fall". Both of these recordings featured Bill Kenny and also reached #1 on the US Pop Charts. In 1946 the Ink Spots earned a #1 spot on the US Pop Charts with "To Each His Own". The Billy Reid composition "The Gypsy" was the Ink Spots' biggest chart success, staying at the #1 position for 13 straight weeks in 1946.

Records that found the Ink Spots in the top five of the US Pop Charts in the 1940s included "When the Swallows Come Back to Capistrano" (#4), "Maybe" (#2), "We Three" (#1), "I Don't Want to Set the World on Fire" (#4), "Don't Get Around Much Anymore" (#2), "A Lovely Way to Spend an Evening" (#2), "I'm Making Believe" (#1), "Into Each Life Some Rain Must Fall" (#1), "I'm Beginning to See the Light" (#5), "The Gypsy" (#1), and "To Each His Own" (#1).

Films
In 1941, the Ink Spots were featured in The Great American Broadcast starring John Payne and Alice Faye. In the film, the Ink Spots played Pullman porters who sang during their breaks. Later in the movie, the Ink Spots "make it big time" and sing live on the radio over a national broadcast. In the movie the group can be seen singing a short segment of "If I Didn't Care", "Alabamy Bound", and "I've Got a Bone to Pick with You". They also are featured in a scene with Faye and Payne providing background vocals on a ballad entitled "Where You Are".

In 1942, the Ink Spots were featured in an Abbott and Costello film, Pardon My Sarong. In this film, the Ink Spots play singing waiters in a nightclub. The group can be seen singing the ballad "Do I Worry?" and the swing song "Shout Brother Shout".

Line-up changes 
In 1943, Ink Spots baritone singer and guitarist Fuqua was drafted into the US Army. He chose his friend Bernie Mackey to be his temporary replacement until he returned to the group. After being with the group for two years, Mackey was replaced by Huey Long in March 1945. Long completed the role as a "fill in" until Fuqua finally returned in October 1945.

Jones died in October 1944, after collapsing on stage at the Cafe Zanzibar in New York City, near the height of their popularity. Jones had been having cerebral hemorrhages for a year, and had fallen ill from it in June 1944. Jones was temporarily replaced by Cliff Givens who filled in for five months, from October 1944 to March 1945. Jones' permanent replacement was to be Bill Kenny's brother (and fraternal twin) Herb Kenny. Herb Kenny sang with the group from 1945 to 1951 when he went out for a career as a solo artist. The last bass singer for the Ink Spots was Adriel McDonald who was with the group from 1951 to 1954. McDonald was previously the Ink Spots' personal valet, a job given to him by Herb Kenny with whom he had sung in a group called "The Cabineers" in the early 1940s.

Due to personality clashes between Bill Kenny and Watson after Jones' death, Kenny decided he would rather carry on as the leader of the group and bought Watson's share of the group for $10,000, which in turn gave Kenny the power to kick Watson out of the group. Watson went on to form a group similar in style to the Ink Spots called the Brown Dots (which later became the Four Tunes). Watson's place was filled by Billy "Butterball" Bowen, who sang with the group from 1944 to 1952.

1950s

Final years
In 1952, Fuqua left Kenny to form his own vocal group using the name "Ink Spots". At this time Kenny and Fuqua each owned 50% of the Ink Spots, however it was decided by court ruling that Kenny's group was to continue on as the original "Ink Spots" while Fuqua's group was to use the name "Charlie Fuqua's New Ink Spots". Fuqua however did not go by this name and in defiance of the court ruling called his group the "original" Ink Spots.

After Fuqua's departure from the Ink Spots in 1952 he was replaced by popular Jazz and R&B guitarist Everett Barksdale. The group now consisted of Bill Kenny (lead tenor), Teddy Williams (second tenor) who had replaced Billy Bowen, Everett Barksdale (baritone and guitar) and Adriel McDonald (bass). After being with the group for only a few months, Williams was replaced by Ernie Brown. Barksdale stayed with the group for about a year before being replaced by baritone vocalist and guitar player named Jimmy Cannady. This line-up of Kenny (lead tenor), Brown (second tenor), Cannady (baritone and guitar), and McDonald (bass) lasted until 1954 when the final change of lineup was made.

In April 1954, Brown was replaced by Henry Braswell, who sang with the Ink Spots for their final three months. In July 1954, Kenny officially disbanded the Ink Spots after an appearance at the "Bolero Bar" in Wildwood, New Jersey.

Members 
inducted into the Rock and Roll Hall of Fame
Hoppy Jones (born as Orville Jones, February 17, 1905, Chicago, Illinois – d. October 18, 1944, New York City) sang bass. He played cello in the manner of a stand up bass.
 Deek Watson (born as Ivory Jones, July 18, 1909, Mounds, Illinois – d. November 4, 1969, Washington, D.C.) sang tenor and played tenor guitar.
 Jerry Daniels (b. December 14, 1915 – d. November 7, 1995, Indianapolis, Indiana) sang tenor and played guitar and ukulele.
 Charlie Fuqua (b. October 20, 1910 – d. December 21, 1971, New Haven, Connecticut) had a baritone voice and played guitar and tenor guitar.
 Billy Kenny (b. June 12, 1914, Philadelphia, Pennsylvania, U.S. – d. March 23, 1978, New Westminster, Canada) sang lead tenor.

Timeline

Non-original Ink Spots groups
Disputes over the rights to use the Ink Spots name began in the late 1940s, resulting in many court cases. Starting in 1954, groups calling themselves "The Ink Spots" sprang up all around the United States. Some groups contained original members Fuqua, McDonald, Bowen, or Watson, but most had no ties to the original group whatsoever. Many groups claimed to have the rights to the name, but no one did. Still, lawsuits were filed between various groups and there was great confusion as to who owned the naming rights. Some groups avoided lawsuits by naming themselves "The Fabulous Ink Spots", "The Famous Ink Spots", "The Amazing Ink Spots", "The Sensational Ink Spots", "The Dynamic Ink Spots", and more.

According to writer Marv Goldberg: "The original group was a partnership, not a corporation, and that influenced [Judge Isidore Wasservogel] to say, in 1955, that when Hoppy Jones died in 1944, it effectively served to terminate the partnership and that no one could truthfully use the name after that." From 1954 to the present, more than 100 groups have used the name "The Ink Spots". In 1967 US federal judge Emmet C. Choate ruled that since so many groups had been using the name "Ink Spots" it had become "public domain" and was free for anyone to use.

Charlie Fuqua's Ink Spots
In 1952, Fuqua left the original Ink Spots led by Kenny to form his own Ink Spots group. Fuqua recorded dozens of singles with his group for King Records as well as releasing two LP (long play) albums for Verve Records. In 1963 Fuqua's group also recorded one 45 RPM record for Ford Records. Fuqua led and was a member of various vocal groups calling themselves "The Ink Spots" until his death in 1971.

Deek Watson's Ink Spots
Watson, who had been forced out of the original Ink Spots in 1944 and briefly sang with Charlie Fuqua's Ink Spots in 1952–1953, started his own vocal group using the name "The Ink Spots" in 1954. Watson made numerous recordings with his "Ink Spots" groups in the 1950s and 1960s. Many of the recordings Watson made with his groups were released and re-released on various low budget labels. Watson led various groups until his death in 1969.

Legitimate members of the Ink Spots
Legitimate members of the Ink Spots included Bill Kenny, Jerry Daniels, Deek Watson, Charlie Fuqua, Hoppy Jones, Bernie Mackey, Huey Long, Cliff Givens, Billy Bowen, Herb Kenny, Adriel McDonald, Jimmy Cannady, Ernie Brown, Henry Braswell, Teddy Williams and Everett Barksdale. Pianists and arrangers included Bob Benson, Asa "Ace" Harris, Ken Bryan, Mort Howard (arranger), Bill Doggett, Ray Tunia, Harold Francis and Fletcher Smith. Some singers have tenuous ties to Deek Watson's or Charlie Fuqua's offshoot groups; many, with no credentials whatsoever, claim to be original members.

Legacy and honors
1946 Cashbox award for making "The Gypsy" the biggest money making song of the year.
1948 awarded a plaque from the Negro Actors Guild for the efforts in "breaking down the walls of racial prejudice".
1989, the Ink Spots were inducted into the Rock and Roll Hall of Fame as "early influences" by Bobby McFerrin; they were listed as Bill Kenny, Charlie Fuqua, Deek Watson, Jerry Daniels, and Orville Jones.
1989, the Ink Spots 1939 recording of "If I Didn't Care" was inducted into the Grammy Hall of Fame
1999, the Ink Spots group was inducted into the Vocal Group Hall of Fame.

The Ink Spots in popular culture

Television appearances
In 1936 the Ink Spots were the first African Americans to appear on television; then in 1948 they continued to be television pioneers by becoming the first black performers to appear on Ed Sullivan's successful TV show. The Ink Spots made guest appearances on Milton Berle's Texaco Star Theater show on three separate occasions in 1949, on The Ed Sullivan Show three times (1948, 1950 and 1952), on Steve Allen's Songs For Sale twice in 1952, and on Star Of The Family once in 1952.

Music videos and live footage
In 1946 a documentary about nightlife in New York City called "March of Time" featured a clip of the Ink Spots singing "I'd Climb The Highest Mountain" live at the Cafe Zanzibar. The clip and outtakes can be found for viewing on various websites. In 1947 video cameras captured segments of the Ink Spots in live performance at the Daily Express Film Ball in London England. This footage can be obtained by British Pathe.

In 1951 Snader Telescriptions produced five "soundies" (also known as music videos) of the Ink Spots. These clips feature the Ink Spots lip syncing to the songs "If I Didn't Care", "You May Be The Sweetheart Of Somebody Else", "The Gypsy", "I'm Heading Back To Paradise", and "It Is No Secret". Bill Kenny's wife Audrey portrays "the gypsy" in the video for "The Gypsy" and can also be seen serving food to the Ink Spots in "You May Be The Sweetheart Of Somebody Else". Billy Bowen's wife Ruth Bowen is seen walking through the set carrying a dog (Bill Kenny's actual pet) and serving drinks in "You May Be The Sweetheart Of Somebody Else".

Ink Spots music used in television and film
The Ink Spots' music has been used in the films Get Low, Radio Days, Raging Bull, Revolutionary Road, The Shawshank Redemption, The Aviator, Iris, Sphere, Tree's Lounge, Malcolm X, Maria's Lovers, How to Make an American Quilt, Men Don't Leave, Joe Versus the Volcano, Spontaneous Combustion, Carmen Miranda: Bananas is My Business, Australia, Mr. Nobody, Hyde Park on Hudson, The Rover, Twenty Bucks, Manchester by the Sea, Logorama, Forbidden Love: The Unashamed Stories of Lesbian Lives, and Heroes.

The Ink Spots' music has been used in such TV shows as The Walking Dead, The Simpsons, The Visitor, The Tourist, The Singing Detective, Sanford, The Blacklist, Defiance, Arrested Development, Better Call Saul, White Collar, Watchmen, and Once Upon a Time.

The Ink Spots in video games
Recordings by the Ink Spots have been featured in the popular Fallout video game franchise. Their recording of "Maybe" was used as the opening theme of Fallout (1997), as well as in the epilogue. It was also played on the in-game radio station Galaxy News Radio in Fallout 3 (2008), alongside their recordings of "I Don't Want to Set the World on Fire" and "Into Each Life Some Rain Must Fall". "I Don't Want to Set the World on Fire" also features in both the game's trailer and its opening cinematic. The song "It's a Sin to Tell a Lie" (Bill Kenny's solo, not original recording from 1941) is played on the in-game radio station Radio New Vegas in the 2010 video game Fallout: New Vegas. In 2015, the group was once again featured in the Fallout franchise, with their recording of the Russ Morgan and Seger Ellis ballad "It's All Over But the Crying" being used in the trailer for Fallout 4; that song is also played on the in-game radio station Diamond City Radio, alongside "I Don't Want to Set the World on Fire", "Maybe", and "Into Each Life Some Rain Must Fall". The former two songs appear once more in Fallout 76 alongside "We Three (My Echo, My Shadow and Me)".

BioShock and BioShock 2 have also made use of the group's recordings: "If I Didn't Care" and "The Best Things in Life Are Free" in the former, and "We Three (My Echo, My Shadow and Me)", "I'm Making Believe" and "Memories of You" in the latter. Still others were included in Mafia II and on the in-game radio stations in L.A. Noire.

Miscellaneous

The Ink Spots appeared as a guest quartet on the April 4, 1948 episode of The Jack Benny Program, singing a version of "If I Didn't Care" as the advertisement for Lucky Strike cigarettes.
In Tex Avery's 1952 cartoon Magical Maestro, Poochini gets sprayed in the face with black ink and then sings a couple of bars of "Everything I Have Is Yours", imitating Kenny and then Jones.
In 1960, The Quarry Men (composed of Paul McCartney, John Lennon, George Harrison and Stuart Sutcliffe, later to form The Beatles) recorded "You'll Be Mine", an Ink Spots parody.
Ian Fleming mentioned the group twice in his 1962 James Bond novel, The Spy Who Loved Me, when the leading female, Vivienne Michel, recalls a love affair from her past. She recalls hearing "Someone's Rocking My Dreamboat", and mistakenly credits the group with singing "Only a Paper Doll to Call My Own" (an apparent reference to The Mills Brothers' song "Paper Doll"). Bond himself overhears the group singing "Java Jive" aboard the US Manta submarine in Thunderball.
The Ink Spots were mentioned in several episodes of the 1970s NBC sitcom Sanford and Son, as one of Fred Sanford's favorite groups, with series star Redd Foxx crooning their song, "If I Didn't Care". Reportedly, Redd Foxx had royalties for singing their music taken out of his salary out of love for the group and because NBC wouldn't personally pay for the rights.
In the 1980s, a commercial for Chanel No. 5 included a version of "I Don't Want to Set the World on Fire" sung solo by Bill Kenny, the former lead tenor of the group. He had recorded with an unknown studio vocal group for a 1977 CBS Records LP entitled The Ink Spots – If I Didn't Care. The recording was used in the ad without permission from Kenny's executrix and widow Audrey Kenny. In 1982 Mrs. Kenny took legal action and, according to Bill Kenny's former pianist Bev Gore-Langton, was successful. The commercial depicted the Transamerica Pyramid building in San Francisco with the shadow of a plane flying overhead.
In the 1980s, "Java Jive" was used in commercials for Sanka coffee, prominently featuring the likes of Lena Horne and Gregory Hines.
"Someone's Rocking my Dreamboat" was sung by Bugs Bunny in the Looney Tunes short, The Big Snooze.
The original 1982 theatrical trailer for the movie Blade Runner prominently featured a short clip of "If I Didn't Care", and the song is used in the early "workprint" version of the film, but it was replaced in the theatrical and all subsequent releases with "One More Kiss, Dear", an original composition in a similar vocal and melodic style.
Heavy metal group Megadeth used "I Don't Want To Set The World On Fire" on their 1988 album So Far, So Good... So What! as an introduction to the song "Set The World Afire".
The Ink Spots were the subject of a 1998 book by Marv Goldberg, More Than Words Can Say: The Ink Spots and Their Music.
Several of the Ink Spots' original recordings are used in the off-Broadway production Sleep No More, which first opened in 2011.
The song "Jukebox Saturday Night", made famous by the Glenn Miller Band, makes a large reference to the Ink Spots, imitating the iconic Ink Spots intro and the style of singing.
The recording "I Don't Want to Set the World on Fire" has featured in multiple television shows and short films, being played at the end of the 2009 short film Logorama, as well as at the end of a special seasonal episode, "Treehouse of Horror XVII", on Fox's The Simpsons.
 Their version of "I'm Beginning to See the Light" with Ella Fitzgerald is featured in the 2016 film Manchester by the Sea.
 Their song "Address Unknown" plays in the opening of Better Call Saul's first episode, "Uno". As well, their rendition of "We Three (My Echo, My Shadow and Me)" plays over the opening scene of the episode, "Smoke".

Hit singles

Notes

See also
 The Bill Kenny Show

References

External links

 Vocal Group Hall of Fame page on The Ink Spots
 The Ink Spots information site
 Ink Spots recordings at the Discography of American Historical Recordings.

American rhythm and blues musical groups
Musical groups from Indianapolis
King Records artists
Top Rank Records artists
American vocal groups
Musical groups established in 1934
Musical groups disestablished in 1954
Musical groups from New York City